The discography of Cro-Mags, a New York hardcore band, consists of six studio albums, one compilation album, a live album, a DVD, a demo, and four music videos.

Studio albums

EPs

Compilation albums

Live albums

Video albums

Demo albums

Music videos 

In 1988, Cro-Mags appeared  in a movie called The Beat as "Iron Skulls", performing the songs "It's the Limit" and "Hard Times".

Discographies of American artists
Heavy metal group discographies
Punk rock group discographies